Tamra Keenan is an Irish singer/songwriter.  She has collaborated with many of the world's leading electronic dance music producers. Keenan also writes music for television and film, and writes lyrics for and collaborates with many other recording artists in most genres of popular music.

Biography 
Keenan moved to London at the age of 17 to pursue a career in music. After a few failed attempts at getting her demos heard with major labels, she started passing them out to DJs on the London Club scene.  One of these demo tapes brought her to the attention of London-based Trance producer Blu Peter, with whom she recorded her first single, "Biological Response".

She then met producer Kevin Beber and they became the breakout breakbeat act Beber & Tamra.  On the strength of their first white-label single "Traveling On", they signed with Mob Records. "Traveling On" became single of the week in NME and on BBC Radio 1.  Their debut album received critical acclaim in major music magazines, including the cover of DJ Mag.  After several Album of the Month honors, Beber & Tamra went on to tour Europe, including a killer debut set at Glastonbury Festival. The duo's follow-up album was delayed, so Tamra joined up with Glen Nicholls of the Future Funk Squad with whom she wrote and sang "Kissing Air" and "Demystified"; she also wrote Future Funk Squad's "Towards the Sun", which her brother Ben sang on.

After touring with Future Funk Squad across Europe and Asia, Keenan set her sights on recording her debut album which would be a return to her musical roots of folk, rock and blues, and a far cry from the breakbeat/synth acts she had worked with early on in her career.

With her new band assembled, she set about writing, recording and performing on the road, garnering the attention of legendary music mogul Derek Green of A&M and China Records. Despite teaming Keenan with guitar virtuoso Phil Manzanera of Roxy Music, Green struggled to get the album signed. Certainly ahead of its time, Keenan's blend of soulful rock and heartfelt lyrics didn't fit into the pop music landscape of the moment.

While continuing to pursue her solo project, Keenan was contacted by house music legend David Morales, who had been spinning "Traveling On" to sold-out crowds in his DJ sets across the globe. Entranced with Tamra's lyrics and vocals, Morales flew her to New York City where she collaborated on his second artist album, 2 Worlds Collide, writing and singing the title track as well as "You Came" and "Here I Am". Up-and-coming DJ/producer Kaskade's remix of the Morales/Keenan collaboration "Here I Am" reached #1 on the Dance Billboard Charts and was featured in the CBS television series The Beautiful Life and the Hollywood blockbuster film The Devil Wears Prada.

This relationship proved to be beneficial to both Keenan and Kaskade as she went on to write and sing "Your Love Is Black" and international club smash "Angel on My Shoulder" for his album Strobelite Seduction.

Keenan has written and recorded with Kaskade, David Morales, BT, Paul Oakenfold, EDX, Bad Boy Bill, Cedric Gervais, Steve Smooth, Tony Arzadon, Starkillers, Nick Terranova, Lenno and many more.

In 2013, Tamra Teamed up with well-renowned producer Andy Gray for TV and film placements with their songs feat on Channel 4 and BBC.

With a truly global reach, Tamra's anthem "Beautiful People" became the soundtrack to the Summerland Festival in Cartagena, Colombia in 2014.

Her collaborations with Kaskade have continued as well.  His album Automatic features two songs written and performed by Keenan as follow-ups.

After a move to Los Angeles in December 2013, Keenan has carved out a niche in the realm of film and television also, penning the theme song for Nickelodeon's hit show Make It Pop with fifteen additional tracks over the first two seasons.

Discography

Studio albums 
 2002: Suite Beat Boy – with Kevin Beber
 2015: Tear Down These Walls – Kaskade (feat. Tamra Keenan) (Warner Music) 
 2015: Where Are You Now? – Kaskade (feat. Tamra Keenan) (Warner Music)
 2018: Mama Ghost

Collaborations 
 2001: "Traveling On" – Beber & Tamra
 2002: "YOU Wonder" – Beber & Tamra 
 2003: "Love in the Time of Thieves" – BT & Kevin Beber
 2004: "Here I Am" – David Morales
 2004: "U Came" – David Morales
 2004: "2 Worlds Collide" – David Morales
 2005: "Towards the Sun" – Future Funk Squad 
 2005: "De-Mystified" – Future Funk Squad 
 2005: "Kissing Air" – Future Funk Squad 
 2008: "Your Love Is Black" – Kaskade
 2008: "Angel on My Shoulder" – Kaskade
 2009: "Days" – Nick Terranova 
 2009: "Why" – Nick Terranova 
 2009: "Moments" – Nick Terranova & Austin Leeds 
 2009: "Calling" – Nick Terranova 
 2009: "Body Soul" – Nick Terranova 
 2009: "Underground" – Nick Terranova 
 2009: "Heartbleed" – Nick Terranova 
 2010: "Out of the Rain" – EDX
 2011: "Knowing You" – Sergio Galoyan
 2011: "You Take Me Here" – Steve Smooth
 2012: "I'm Not Going Back" – Krystina Myles 
 2012: "Stalker" – Steve Smooth
 2012: "All You & I" – Steve Smooth & Tony Arzadon 
 2012: "Unsaid" – Bad Boy Bill
 2012: "I Don't Belong Here" – David Morales & Kaskade
 2012: "Maybe It's Over" – Paul Oakenfold
 2012: "Sleep" – Paul Oakenfold 
 2012: "Warrior" – EDX 
 2012: "2 Hearts, 1 Mind" – EDX 
 2013: "Beautiful People" – Moska & MYNC 
 2013: "7 Days" – David Morales 
 2013: "Lost in the City" – Inphinity & Kalendr
 2013: "Just 3 Little Words – Kristyna Myles
 2013: "Does He Love You Better" – Bo Saris
 2014: "Temptation" – Greyson Chance
 2015: "The Higher Ground" – Matt Simons
 2015: "Changing Man" – The 3 J's
 2016: "Soldier" – Blasterjaxx & Breathe Carolina
 2017: "Sunrise Riot" – Ravell 
 2019: "Away From the Storm" – David Morales

Singles 
 2012: "Pontius Pilate" – Tamra Keenan (Blackhole)

Songs for TV and film 
 2006: "Here I Am" – The Devil Wears Prada
 2008: "Here I Am" – CBS Beautiful Life 
 2015: Make It Pop – Nickelodeon
 "Now I Am Here" 
 "Get It Right"  
 "Spotlightz"
 "My Girls"
 "Girls"
 "The Rules"

See also 
List of number-one dance hits (United States)
List of artists who reached number one on the US Dance chart

References

External links 
  Tamra on MySpace

American house musicians
American women singers
Living people
Year of birth missing (living people)
21st-century American women